Forest Lakes is a rural locality in the Kapiti Coast District of the Wellington Region of New Zealand's North Island. It is located between Ōtaki and the northern boundary of Kapiti Coast. The area contains Lake Waitawa, Ngatotara Lagoon, and several smaller lakes. Lake Kopureherehere is just north of the district border.

Forest Lakes Station flourished in the area from the 1870s to the 1920s. The Forest Lakes Homestead is now part of a camping and conference centre.

Demographics

Forest Lakes had a population of 663 at the 2018 New Zealand census, an increase of 39 people (6.2%) since the 2013 census, and an increase of 72 people (12.2%) since the 2006 census. There were 255 households. There were 315 males and 348 females, giving a sex ratio of 0.91 males per female. The median age was 52 years (compared with 37.4 years nationally), with 99 people (14.9%) aged under 15 years, 96 (14.5%) aged 15 to 29, 306 (46.2%) aged 30 to 64, and 159 (24.0%) aged 65 or older.

Ethnicities were 90.0% European/Pākehā, 16.3% Māori, 1.8% Pacific peoples, 3.2% Asian, and 1.8% other ethnicities (totals add to more than 100% since people could identify with multiple ethnicities).

The proportion of people born overseas was 15.4%, compared with 27.1% nationally.

Although some people objected to giving their religion, 55.2% had no religion, 33.0% were Christian, 0.5% were Muslim and 1.8% had other religions.

Of those at least 15 years old, 138 (24.5%) people had a bachelor or higher degree, and 111 (19.7%) people had no formal qualifications. The median income was $30,000, compared with $31,800 nationally. The employment status of those at least 15 was that 270 (47.9%) people were employed full-time, 90 (16.0%) were part-time, and 18 (3.2%) were unemployed.

References

Populated places in the Wellington Region
Kapiti Coast District